Brian "Bad Ass" Douwes (born 21 November 1987 in Beverwijk) is a Dutch kickboxer fighting out of Team Spirit, formerly known as Top Team Beverwijk in Beverwijk. He competed in K-1, Enfusion Live, Superkombat and Glory.

As of 1 May 2017, he is ranked the #10 light-heavyweight in the world by Combat Press.

Biography and career
Brian Douwes was born in Beverwijk, North Holland. He started training Muay Thai when he was 14 years old, under the guidance of former world champion Gilbert Ballantine, Hans Nijman, Dick Vrij. He made his K-1 debut on the undercard of K-1 World MAX 2006 Netherlands tournament against Sander Duyvis, winning the fight by unanimous decision.

Douwes made his breakthrough at the K-1 World GP 2008 in Amsterdam when he knocked out James McSweeney in the first round and entered the tournament as the reserve fighter after Freddy Kemayo had to pull out due to an injury. His opponent in the semi-finals was Zabit Samedov. Douwes took the fight to the extra round but lost the evenly fought battle by unanimous decision.

In 2008 he competed for Planet Battle in Macau, China where he was runner up, losing in the final to Thor Hoopman.

A year later he returned to Macau to compete in the Challenger Tournament and won the tournament by defeating three opponents that night.

In 2013 he competed in Enfusion Search for the Superpro.

He returned to winning ways with a KO win over Fikri Ameziane on 25 January 2014 at Enfusion Live 13 – Eindhoven, Netherlands. They pummeled each other at the center of the ring early in the first round. Trading continued in the second when a short right to the jaw of Ameziane made judge to count. Douwes finished the fight in the third round at 2:55 with a right hand that caught Ameziane as he came forward.

He defeated Srdjan Seles via decision at GFC Series 1 in Dubai, UAE on 29 May 2014.

In 2015 after he won the European WFCA title in 2014, he returned to the ring, winning against Tarik Khbabez and Jamal Ben Saddik.

In 2016 he had last minute calls to fight in Glory Kickboxing against Saulo Cavalari and Guto Inocente. Untrained and not prepared, he took the fight like a warrior, but he lost on points.

In 2017 and 2018 he continued to fight.

His next fight was scheduled for 17 February 2019, in a four-man tournament for World Fighting League.

Ganryujima
On 28 February 2015 at Differ Ariake in Tokyo, Japan Douwes participated in the first hybrid MMA tournament called Ganryujima and broadcast on Fuji 1 Sports. The idea of the tournament was basically like the Kumite in Bloodsport. He represented kickboxing alongside eight men from different fight styles: Judo, Karate, Capoeira, Senegalese Wrestling, Sumo, MMA, Shuai Jiao, and Combat Sambo. There was also an American footballer. Douwes won the tournament, defeating Kamen Georgiev (Combat Sambo), Han Wula (MMA/Shuai Jiao) and Amaramend Boldo (MMA/Sumo), all by first-round KO.

Ganryujima record

Titles and achievements
 2017 A1 WCC Heawyweight Qualification Tournament Runner Up
 2017 WFL Light Heavyweight Tournament Champion
 2014 W.F.C.A. European K1 Super Heavyweight Champion +95 kg
 2009 The Challenger tournament champion
 2008 Planet Battle tournament finalist
 2008 K-1 World GP in Amsterdam semi-finalist

Kickboxing record

See also
 List of male kickboxers
 List of K-1 events

References

1987 births
Living people
Dutch male kickboxers
Heavyweight kickboxers
Dutch Muay Thai practitioners
Sportspeople from Beverwijk
Glory kickboxers
SUPERKOMBAT kickboxers